Yacht is a public domain dice game, similar to the Latin American game Generala, the English game of Poker Dice,  the Scandinavian Yatzy, and Cheerio. Yacht dates back to at least 1938, and is a contemporary of the similar three-dice game Crag. Yahtzee is a later development, similar to Yacht in both name and content.   

The name Yacht is also used for a number of later dice games that include many features of Yahtzee, being closer to Yahtzee than the original Yacht game.

Gameplay 
These rules relate to the 1938 version of Yacht. The object of the game is to score points by rolling five dice to make certain combinations. The dice can be rolled up to three times in a turn to try to make these combinations. A game consists of twelve rounds. After each round the player chooses which scoring category is to be used for that round. Once a category has been used in the game, it cannot be used again. The scoring categories have varying point values, some of which are fixed values and others where the score depends on the value of the dice. A Yacht is five-of-a-kind and scores 50 points; the highest of any category. The winner is the player who scores the most points.

Scoring 
The following are the 12 categories and the points scored in those categories:

If a category is chosen but the dice do not match the requirements of the category the player scores 0 in that category.

A Yacht cannot be scored on Full House, but can be scored on Four of a Kind, although the fifth die is not counted in the score. The scores for the Straights vary, but a typical score is 30 for each.

The maximum possible score depends on the scoring rules used, but with the above rules and both straights counting 30, the maximum score is 297.

Comparison with Yahtzee 
The rules of Yacht differ from those of Yahtzee in a number of ways:
It does not have an upper section bonus.
There is no three-of-a-kind category.
Both straights are set sequences of five ("Large Straight" is 2-3-4-5-6, "Small Straight" is 1-2-3-4-5).
There are no Yahtzee bonuses or Joker rule.

There are a number of differences to the category names compared to Yahtzee. "Aces" is often called "Ones", "Large Straight" is called "Big Straight" (there is no "Small Straight" category in Yacht), "Yahtzee" is called "Yacht" and "Chance" is called "Choice". The order of the categories on the score sheet can also be different from that used on a Yahtzee score sheet. There is no "upper" or "lower" section scoring, just a "Total" row at the bottom of the score sheet.

Although there are no official rules for Yacht, the scoring of some categories generally differs from that used in Yahtzee. Four-of-a-kind scores the sum of those four dice, not all five dice. Full house scores the sum of the five dice, not a fixed score of 25. The scores for the straights can be different from those used in Yahtzee (40 points in Yahtzee.)

References

Sequence dice games